Yuri Manuylov (born 10 June 1964 in Krasnodar) is a Russian former cyclist.

Major results
1989
 3rd Team time trial, World Road Championships
1990
 1st Duo Normand (with Dimitri Vassilichenko)
 1st Stage 7 Settimana Ciclistica Lombarda
 1st Stage 8 Tour de Normandie
 1st Overall Tour du Poitou-Charentes
1st Stage 4
 3rd Overall Tour du Gévaudan Languedoc-Roussillon
1st Stage 2
1991
 1st Stage 3 Vuelta a Castilla y León
1992
 1st Stage 5 Volta a Portugal
1993
 5th Rund um Köln

Grand Tour general classification results timeline

References

1964 births
Living people
Russian male cyclists
Sportspeople from Krasnodar